This page details the all-time statistics, records, and other achievements pertaining to the Phoenix Suns.

Individual awards

NBA Most Valuable Player Award
Charles Barkley — 1993
Steve Nash — 2005, 2006

NBA Rookie of the Year Award
Alvan Adams — 1976
Walter Davis — 1978
Amar'e Stoudemire — 2003

NBA Sixth Man of the Year Award
Eddie Johnson — 1989
Danny Manning — 1998
Rodney Rogers — 2000
Leandro Barbosa — 2007

NBA Sportsmanship Award
Grant Hill — 2008, 2010

NBA Most Improved Player Award
Kevin Johnson — 1989
Boris Diaw — 2006
Goran Dragić — 2014

NBA Coach of the Year Award
Cotton Fitzsimmons — 1989
Mike D'Antoni — 2005
Monty Williams — 2022

NBA Executive of the Year Award
Jerry Colangelo – 1976, 1981, 1989, 1993
Bryan Colangelo – 2005
James Jones – 2021

J. Walter Kennedy Citizenship Award
Kevin Johnson – 1991
Steve Nash – 2007

Best NBA Player ESPY Award
Charles Barkley — 1994
Steve Nash — 2005

All-NBA First Team
Connie Hawkins — 1970
Paul Westphal — 1977, 1979, 1980
Dennis Johnson — 1981
Charles Barkley — 1993
Jason Kidd — 1999, 2000, 2001
Steve Nash — 2005, 2006, 2007
Amar'e Stoudemire — 2007
Devin Booker — 2022

All-NBA Second Team
Paul Westphal — 1978
Walter Davis — 1978, 1979
Kevin Johnson — 1989, 1990, 1991, 1994
Tom Chambers — 1989, 1990
Charles Barkley — 1994, 1995
Amar'e Stoudemire — 2005, 2008, 2010
Steve Nash — 2008, 2010
Chris Paul — 2021

All-NBA Third Team
Kevin Johnson — 1992
Charles Barkley — 1996
Stephon Marbury — 2003
Shawn Marion — 2005, 2006
Shaquille O'Neal — 2009
Goran Dragić — 2014
Chris Paul — 2022

NBA All-Defensive First Team
Don Buse — 1978, 1979, 1980
Dennis Johnson — 1981, 1982, 1983
Jason Kidd — 1999, 2001
Raja Bell — 2007
Mikal Bridges — 2022

NBA All-Defensive Second Team
Paul Silas — 1971, 1972, 1973
Dick Van Arsdale — 1974
Dan Majerle — 1991, 1993
Jason Kidd — 2000
Clifford Robinson — 2000
Raja Bell — 2008

NBA All-Rookie First Team
Gary Gregor — 1969
Mike Bantom — 1974
Alvan Adams — 1976
Ron Lee — 1977
Walter Davis — 1978
Armon Gilliam — 1988
Michael Finley — 1996
Amar'e Stoudemire — 2003
Devin Booker — 2016
Deandre Ayton — 2019

NBA All-Rookie Second Team
Richard Dumas — 1993
Wesley Person — 1995
Shawn Marion — 2000
Joe Johnson — 2002
Marquese Chriss — 2017
Josh Jackson — 2018

NBA All-Star Weekend

NBA All-Star Game head coach 
John MacLeod — 1981
Paul Westphal — 1993, 1995
Mike D'Antoni — 2007
Monty Williams — 2022

NBA All-Star Game Most Valuable Player Award
Shaquille O'Neal — 2009

NBA All-Star Weekend Three-Point Shootout
Quentin Richardson — 2005
Devin Booker — 2018

NBA All-Star Weekend Skills Challenge
Steve Nash — 2005, 2010

NBA All-Star Weekend Slam Dunk Contest
Larry Nance — 1984
Cedric Ceballos — 1992

Franchise leaders

(As of the 2022–23 season)

Bold denotes still active with team.

Italic denotes still active, but not with team.

Games played

Points

Minutes Played

Rebounds

Assists

Steals

Blocks

Field goals

Three point field goals

Free throws

Franchise record for championships

See also
Phoenix Suns Ring of Honor

References

records
National Basketball Association accomplishments and records by team